A Journey into Space is a compilation album of early singles of Gigi D'Agostino, released in Germany in 1994 by ZYX Music.

Track listing
"Noise Maker Theme"
"The Mind's Journey"
"Panic Mouse"
"Giallone Remix"
"Meravillia"
"Creative Nature Vol.1"
"Panic Mouse" (Stress Mix)
"Creative Nature Vol.1" (Adam & Eve)
"The Mind's Journey" (Brain Mix)

References

1994 compilation albums
Gigi D'Agostino albums